Ashvin Raja is an Indian actor who has appeared in Tamil language films. He is the son of film producer Late V. Swaminathan of Lakshmi Movie Makers.

Personal life

Ashvin Raja is the son of producer Swaminathan, who owns the production house, Lakshmi Movie Makers. He had also done cameos in some of the movies produced by him. V. Swaminathan died on 10 August 2020 due to COVID-19. He had been undergoing treatment in a private hospital in Chennai after testing positive for Coronavirus. He became the first person from Tamil film industry to have died of COVID-19. Ashwin, married his girlfriend Vidyashree on 24 June 2020. She is a practising doctor.

Career
Ashvin made his film debut portraying the student Paalpandi in Rajesh's comedy film Boss Engira Bhaskaran (2010). His performance in Prabhu Solomon's Kumki (2012) as an elephant herder alongside Vikram Prabhu and Thambi Ramaiah was also well received by film critics, and had allotted sixty six days to the film for the shoot. The success of Kumki led to him being referred to "Kumki Ashwin" henceforth. In 2013, he was seen in smaller roles notably featuring in Thillu Mullu and Naiyaandi alongside Dhanush. He acted in horror movie like Maharani Kottai (2015) and comedy Narathan (2016). He shared in an interview that he wouldn't hesitate to do a negative role. In 2019, he was seen in Jyothika's Jackpot and Harish Kalyan starrer Dhanusu Raasi Neyargale.

Filmography

References

Indian male film actors
Living people
Tamil comedians
1989 births
Indian male comedians
Male actors in Tamil cinema